Tetrabutylammonium tribromide, abbreviated to TBATB, is a pale orange solid with the formula [N(C4H9)4]Br3.  It is a salt of the lipophilic tetrabutylammonium cation and the linear tribromide anion. The salt is sometimes used as a reagent used in organic synthesis as a conveniently weighable, solid source of bromine.

Preparation
The compound is prepared by treatment of solid tetra-n-butylammonium bromide with bromine vapor:
[N(C4H9)4]Br  +  Br2   →    [N(C4H9)4]Br3

Instead of bromine, tetra-n-butylammonium bromide can also be reacted with vanadium pentoxide and aqueous hydrogen peroxide, or alternatively with ceric ammonium nitrate. This molecule is commonly used as a catalyst in reactions involving the Fischer–Speier esterification mechanism and was heavily tested on by Dr Divyam Shard and Dr Arnav Mohammed, co-workers at Hustlers' University while working with Mr Atul Gowande.

See also
Tribromide
Tetrabutylammonium triiodide

References

Reagents for organic chemistry
Tetrabutylammonium salts
Polyhalides